Trolley is a 2023 South Korean television series starring Kim Hyun-joo and Park Hee-soon. It premiered on SBS TV in December 19, 2022, and aired every Monday and Tuesday at 22:00 (KST). It is also available for streaming on Netflix in selected regions.

Synopsis
Trolley tells the story of the wife of a member of the National Assembly who lives quietly while hiding a secret from her past, and the dilemmas that ensue as her secrets are revealed to the world.

Cast

Main
 Kim Hyun-joo as Kim Hye-joo/ Kim Jae-eun  
 Jung Yi-joo as young Kim Hye-joo/ Kim Jae-eun
 The wife of a member of the National Assembly. She runs a book repair shop.
 Park Hee-soon as Nam Joong-do 
 A promising member of the National Assembly.
 Kim Soo-oh as young Nam Joong-do
 Kim Mu-yeol as Jang Woo-jae 
 Nam Joong-do's senior assistant, whom he trusts most.
 Jung Soo-bin as Kim Soo-bin
 She lives in a group home due to her parent's divorce.

Supporting

Kim Hye-joo's Family
 Seo Jeong-yeon as Hyun Yeo-jin
 Kim Hye-joo's close friend
 Choi Myung-bin as Nam Yoon-seo  
 Nam Joong-do and Kim Hye-joo's daughter.

Nam Joong-do's Aides
 Yoon Sa-bong as Kim Bit-na  
 A person who entered the National Council as a 9th-grade executive secretary and advanced to 5th-grade.
 Jung Soon-won as Go Min-seok 
 Assistant to Nam Joong-do.
 Choi Soo-im as Choi Ja-young 
 Recent college graduate who applied to be Nam Joong-do's 9th-grade administrative secretary.

Youngsan People
 Ryu Hyun-kyung as Jin Seung-hee 
 Oh Yu-jin as young Jin Seung-hee  
 Kim Hye-joo's high school friend and the wife of a politician.
 Ki Tae-young as Choi Ki-young 
 Kim Il-ji as young Choi Ki-young  
 Jin Seung-hee's husband.

National Assembly
 Kim Mi-kyung as Woo Jin-seok
 A former judge and now his party's leader in the National Assembly.

Others
 Lim Chul-hyung as Seung-gyu's father
 Jung Taek-hyun as Nam Ji-hoon
 Nam Joong-do's deceased son.
 Won Mi-won as Cho Gwi-soon
 Gil Hae-yeon as Lee Yoo-shin
 Jang Gwang as Kang Soon-hong
 Lee Min-jae as Jin Seung-ho
 Younger brother. Twins of Jin Seung-hee.
 Kim Gyun-ha

Production

Casting
Actress Kim Sae-ron was initially confirmed to play the role of Kim Soo-bin, but on May 19, 2022, she withdrew from the series following a DUI incident. On June 2, 2022, it was reported that actress Jung Soo-bin was being considered for the role of Kim Soo-bin. On September 7, 2022, it was confirmed that Jung Soo-bin would play Kim Soo-bin.

Premiere
On September 7, it was confirmed that the series would air in December 2022.

Viewership

Notes

References

External links
  
 
 
 

Korean-language television shows
Seoul Broadcasting System television dramas
Television series by Studio S
2022 South Korean television series debuts 
South Korean mystery television series
South Korean melodrama television series
Korean-language Netflix exclusive international distribution programming
2023 South Korean television series endings